NIRATIAS (an acronym for "Nothing Is Real and This Is a Simulation") is the ninth studio album by American rock band Chevelle, released on March 5, 2021. It was preceded by three singles: "Self Destructor", "Peach", and "Remember When". The album was produced by Joe Barresi and was their first studio album in five years, the previous being 2016's The North Corridor. It is also their first album as a two-piece, as bassist Dean Bernardini left the band in late 2019. It marked the final album on their contract with long-time label Epic Records; future music from the band will be released independently.

Unlike previous Chevelle albums, NIRATIAS is a concept album, with more instrumental and spoken word tracks, dealing with themes such as interstellar travel, mistrust in leadership, loss, and the past.

Background
In June 2019, it was announced that the band entered the studio with producer Joe Barresi, who also produced their last three albums. Drummer Sam Loeffler stated they had been writing material for a year and a half, meaning the writing process of this album has taken longer than their other albums. The band recorded eight songs in 2019 and the other five were finished by March 2020. Speaking about the lyrical direction of the album, vocalist Pete Loeffler stated:

Artwork for the album is by Boris Vallejo, also known for designing the posters used for films like Knightriders and National Lampoon's Vacation. The title of the album is an acronym for "Nothing Is Real and This Is a Simulation" Producer Joe Barresi challenged the band to write more melodic songs, as opposed to the darker and heavier material from their past two albums. 

About the music on NIRATIAS, Pete said, "It's just more melodic singing over heavy stuff...It's not as much screaming on this album, for sure."

Release
On November 6, 2020, the band uploaded a video stating that a their new album has already been completed and was awaiting release. On November 8, 2020, the band released an acoustic version of the new song "Endlessly". The band released a music video for the lead single, "Self Destructor" on January 8, 2021. The album was released on March 5, 2021. On January 25, 2021, the band revealed the track listing. On January 29, 2021, the band released the second single from the album, "Peach". On February 19, 2021, the band released the third single from the album, "Remember When". On May 1, 2021, the band released a music video for the song "Mars Simula".  "Self Destructor" is included in the 2021 film, Hitman's Wife's Bodyguard.

Composition and themes 
NIRATIAS has been described as alternative metal, hard rock, alternative rock, progressive rock, art rock, and demonstrates science-fiction themes. The opener "Verruckt" is an instrumental song that contains "sludgy stoner-doom metal" riffs. "So Long, Mother Earth" is a song about space exploration and AllMusic compared it to "Tool's dystopian art-metal". The closing track "Lost in Digital Woods" is a spoken word and ambient Overall, the album is more melodic and contains less screaming than their last two albums. AllMusic described the album as a "sci-fi fever dream".

Critical reception

James Christopher Monger of AllMusic praised NIRATIAS as a "visceral sci-fi fever dream that pairs tight, caustic riffage with billowing melodic contrails". He criticized the absence of former bassist Dean Bernardini, stating, "it's in these beefier numbers that the absence of Bernardini is felt -- in addition to handling vocals, guitar, and piano, Pete Loeffler was tasked with filling in on bass as well, and while his parts are more than adequate, the paucity of low-end throughout NIRATIAS is hard to ignore." Gerrod Harris of Spill Magazine stated, "Chevelle has written the soundtrack warning of the dystopian future that looks more like Blade Runner and Total Recall than we'd like on NIRATIAS. The album ties together a tight recorded performance that sounds larger than life along with strong, unique songwriting that propelled Chevelle forward for just over 20 years." The staff review at Sputnikmusic generally praised the album for being slightly different due to its "interlude-filled tracklist and a sort of unifying theme throughout" though conceded that they were really only "baby steps" towards making a different sounding Chevelle album, hoping that they choose to "branch out more" on their next album.

Accolades

Track listing

Personnel
Credits for NIRATIAS adapted from liner notes.

Chevelle
Pete Loeffler – vocals, guitar, bass guitar, piano
Sam Loeffler – drums

Additional musicians
Brian Kilgore – timpani, chimes, percussion (track 10)
Joe Barresi – additional percussion

Production
Joe Barresi – producer, mixing
Mark "Stig" Daughney – guitar tech
Dan Druff – guitar tech
Mike Fasano – drum tech
Bruce Jacoby – drum tech
Jun Murakawa – assistant engineer
Greg Foeller – assistant engineer
Bob Ludwig – mastering

Artwork
Jeff Schulz – art direction and design
Boris Vallejo – cover illustration
Joseph Cultice – photography

Charts

Weekly charts

Year-end charts

References

2021 albums
Chevelle (band) albums
Epic Records albums
Albums produced by Joe Barresi
Albums with cover art by Boris Vallejo
Art rock albums by American artists
Progressive rock albums by American artists